Rainer Jarohs (born August 8, 1957) is a German former footballer.

He played in the East German top-flight only for FC Hansa Rostock (259 matches, 76 goals).

In three full A internationals for East Germany he scored one goal.

References

External links
International career

1957 births
Living people
Sportspeople from Rostock
People from Bezirk Rostock
German footballers
East German footballers
Footballers from Mecklenburg-Western Pomerania
East Germany international footballers
Association football forwards
FC Hansa Rostock players
DDR-Oberliga players